Synchronized swimming at the 2010 South American Games in Medellín was held from March 26 to March 29. All games were played at Complejo Acuático.

Medal summary

Medalists

References

2010 South American Games
Qualification tournaments for the 2011 Pan American Games
South American Games
2010